Dovercourt was the name of a provincial riding in Ontario, Canada.  It existed from the 1926 election to the 1999 election. When it was established, it bordered Brockton on to the west, York South to the north, and Bracondale on the east. Lake Ontario was its southern border for most of its existence. At its abolition in 1999, it consisted of that part of the city of Toronto bounded on the north by the former city limits, on the east by Bathurst Street, on the south by Bloor Street and on the west by the CN Railway and St. Clair Avenue. It was redistributed into Davenport, St. Paul's and Trinity—Spadina ridings.

Members of Provincial Parliament

Election results

1926 boundaries

1934 boundaries

1966 boundaries

1974 boundaries

1987 boundaries

References

Notes

Citations

Former provincial electoral districts of Ontario
Provincial electoral districts of Toronto
1925 establishments in Ontario
1996 disestablishments in Ontario